The 12th World Cup season began in December 1977 and concluded in March 1978.  Ingemar Stenmark of Sweden won his third consecutive overall title.  Hanni Wenzel of Liechtenstein won the women's overall title.

A break in the schedule was for the 1978 World Championships, held in Garmisch-Partenkirchen, Bavaria, West Germany, between 29 January and 5 February 1978.

During this season, no combined races were included in the World Cup. Combined was resumed in the following season 1978/79.  A demonstration parallel slalom race was run as the last race of the season, in Arosa, Switzerland on 19 March 1978, but it did not count in the official standings for either men or women.  However, it became the model for a season-ending team parallel slalom race to be run as a part of the season-ending events.

Calendar

Men

Ladies

Men

Overall 

In Men's Overall World Cup 1977/78 the best 3 results of each discipline count; best three downhills, best three giant slaloms and best three slaloms. The parallel slalom only counts for the Nationscup (or was a show-event). 24 racers had a point deduction. Ingemar Stenmark won his third Overall World Cup in a row.

Downhill 

see complete table

In Men's Downhill World Cup 1977/78 the best 5 results count. For the very first time there was a shared win, when Josef Walcher and Sepp Ferstl tied in the second race at Kitzbühel. Franz Klammer won his fourth Downhill World Cup in a row.

Giant Slalom 

In Men's Giant Slalom World Cup 1977/78 the best 5 results count. Ingemar Stenmark regained his Giant Slalom World Cup title after losing the previous year on a tiebreak.

Slalom 

In Men's Slalom World Cup 1977/78 the best 5 results count. Ingemar Stenmark won his fourth Slalom World Cup in a row.

Ladies

Overall 

In Women's Overall World Cup 1977/78 the best 3 results of each discipline count; best three downhills, best three giant slaloms and best three slaloms. The parallel slalom only counts for the Nationscup (or was a show-event). 17 racers had a point deduction.

Downhill 

In Women's Downhill World Cup 1977/78 the best 5 results count. Annemarie Moser-Pröll won 5 races and won the cup with maximum points. She won her sixth Downhill World Cup.

Giant Slalom 

In Women's Giant Slalom World Cup 1977/78 the best 5 results count. Lise-Marie Morerod won her third Giant Slalom World Cup in a row! This record is still unbeaten!

Slalom 

In Women's Slalom World Cup 1977/78 the best 5 results count.

Nations Cup

Overall

Men 
All points were shown including individual deduction. But without parallel slalom, because result ? (Also possible, that the parallel slalom was only a show-event.)

Ladies 
All points were shown including individual deduction but without parallel slalom, because parallel slalom was only an exhibition event.

References

External links
FIS-ski.com - World Cup standings – 1978

FIS Alpine Ski World Cup
Alpine skiing
Alpine skiing